Eucalyptus argillacea, commonly known as Mount House box, or northern grey box is a tree that is endemic to northern Australia. It has rough, fibrous bark, lance-shaped adult leaves, flower buds usually in groups of seven, creamy white flowers and conical fruit.

Description
Flowering occurs from April to July or from October to December and the flowers are creamy white.

This species is similar to other box-type eucalypts found in tropical areas including E. tectifica, E. distans and E. obconica.

Taxonomy and naming
Eucalyptus argillacea was first formally described in 1918 by William Vincent Fitzgerald and the description was publish in Joseph Maiden's book A Critical Revision of the Genus Eucalyptus from specimens collected by Fitzgerald in 1905 from around the base of Mount House. The specific epithet (argillacea) is a Latin word meaning "clayey", referring to the soil at the type location.

Distribution and habitat
Mount House box is found along watercourses and on plains where it grows in alluvium and heavy clay soils. Populations are found only in the Kimberley region of Western Australia. George M. Chippendale (1988) recognized its occurrence also in Northern Territory and northern Queensland, synonymizing E. leucophylla  (now considered to be a separate taxon whose type locality is Queensland) and citing specimens G.M. Chippendale 2171 (now its precise determination withdrawn), R.E. Winkworth 1051, B. Hyland 6283 and L. Pedley 2056 (all of the last three currently re-determined as E. chlorophylla ).

See also

List of Eucalyptus species

References

Eucalypts of Western Australia
Trees of Australia
argillacea
Myrtales of Australia
Plants described in 1918